Goran Đukanović, (born 5 November 1976) is a Montenegrin former handball player.

Career
Over the course of his career, Đukanović played for his hometown club Lovćen on several occasions, helping them win back-to-back Yugoslav championships in 2000 and 2001. He also played abroad for Al Ahli Doha (Qatar), Trieste (Italy), Zagreb (Croatia) and Gold Club (Slovenia).

At international level, Đukanović represented Serbia and Montenegro (known as FR Yugoslavia until 2003) in five major tournaments, winning the bronze medal at the 2001 World Championship. He also participated in the 2000 Summer Olympics. After the split of Serbia and Montenegro, Đukanović captained Montenegro at the 2008 European Championship.

Honours
Lovćen
 Handball Championship of FR Yugoslavia: 1999–2000, 2000–01
 Handball Cup of FR Yugoslavia: 2001–02, 2002–03

References

External links
 EHF record
 Olympic record

1976 births
Living people
Sportspeople from Cetinje
Yugoslav male handball players
Montenegrin male handball players
Olympic handball players of Yugoslavia
Handball players at the 2000 Summer Olympics
RK Metaloplastika players
RK Zagreb players
Expatriate handball players
Serbia and Montenegro expatriate sportspeople in Qatar
Serbia and Montenegro expatriate sportspeople in Italy
Serbia and Montenegro expatriate sportspeople in Croatia
Serbia and Montenegro expatriate sportspeople in Slovenia